The 2010 President's Cup is the 60th season of the President's Cup, a knock-out competition for Maldives' top 4 football clubs. Victory Sports Club are the defending champions, having defeated VB Sports Club in last season's final.

Broadcasting rights
The broadcasting rights for all the matches of 2010 Maldives President's Cup were given to the Television Maldives.

Qualifier
Top 4 teams after the end of 2010 Dhivehi League will be qualified for the President's Cup.

Final qualifier

Semi-final Qualifier

Semi-final

Final

References
 President's Cup 2010 at RSSSF

President's Cup (Maldives)
Pres